The Baltimore and Ohio’s P-7 class was a class of 20 Pacific type locomotives built in 1927. Named for the first 20 Presidents of the United States, they were the prime motive power for the B&O’s top passenger trains for 31 years. One example, Baltimore and Ohio 5300, the "President Washington", has been preserved.

Design 
The P7s were rather simple locomotives when built. Bearing a considerable resemblance to the Pennsylvania Railroad’s K4s, the two designs did differ in their style of firebox and boiler pressure. The engines produced 50,000 lbs. of starting tractive effort and could pull heavyweight passenger trains up to 80 miles an hour. Water scoops mounted on the underside of the tender allowed the locomotives to refill their 11,000-gallon tanks without stopping. The cabs of the locomotives were equipped with automatic train control, which improved safety by forcibly applying the brakes if the engineer failed to acknowledge an unfavorable signal.

The engines would receive upgrades over their 31-year careers and some locomotives received streamlined shrouds, but the class never saw a major rebuild. In 1937 locomotive 5304 was rebuilt by the B&O into a Class P-7a streamlined locomotive. In 1942   locomotive 5306 was rebuilt into a Class P-7b streamlined locomotive. In 1944 locomotives 5305, 5308, 5309, 5318 were rebuilt into Class P-7c. In 1946 locomotives 5301-5303 were rebuilt into Class P-7d’s. Locomotive 5304 was also rebuilt to Class P-7d in 1946  .

*The entries in this column are the numbers assigned to the locomotives when built. Some engines were renumbered before being retired.

Service 
With the introduction of the P-7 class into its passenger fleet, the B&O sought to distinguish itself from its competitors, mainly the Pennsylvania Railroad. To accomplish this, instead of the usual simplistic black paint scheme, each of the P-7s would be adorned with names after the first 20 Presidents of the United States (a single locomotive, “President Adams”, symbolized both John Adams and John Quincy Adams). Combined with a vibrant green paint scheme and gold trim, the railroad hoped to make the class more distinctive and memorable. The locomotives were put on display frequently for public relations, with the class making its debut performance at the Fair of the Iron Horse, which celebrated the railroad’s 100th anniversary in 1927.

The locomotives were used throughout the B&O’s network in the eastern US, with their most famous efforts being the Royal Blue, a high-speed train connecting Washington DC and Jersey City. Also used between Baltimore and Philadelphia, the engines were used mainly in the Midwest leading up to their retirement.

Preservation 
Being an early adopter of diesel power, the B&O retired the P7s by the late 1950s. No. 5300 was saved for safekeeping and donation by Ed Striegel of Striegel Supply & Equipment Corp., a business on Chemical Road in Curtis Bay, Maryland. Mr. Striegel bought railroad equipment for parting out and future sales to other railroads, this though was not the case for the steam locomotives on the property. Upon Mr. Striegel's death, the Baltimore Sun wrote, "In the 1950s, while visiting a storage lot for decommissioned B&O steam engines, Mr. Striegel discovered two historically significant locomotives – the President Washington, No. 100, the high-wheeling Pacific Class that had pulled such classic trains as the Capitol Limited, and a Q-3 class 2-8-2 Mikado type locomotive that had been built in 1918. He salvaged them and donated them to the B&O Railroad Museum. 'They are the linchpins of our collection,' said Courtney B. Wilson, executive director of the museum. 'Ed saved two significant pieces for the museum and, without his help, they would have been lost forever,' he said. 'In my opinion, he was a phenomenal Baltimorean. He was a quiet, unassuming and a very generous guy. The museum was his favorite place to come and he was always looking for ways to improve and enhance its collections,' Mr. Wilson said.

When the museum received No. 5300, it was then repainted in its original 1927 appearance which included: renumbering to 5300 from No.100, the dual-beam headlight swapped for a single beam Pyle National headlight, and the engine was repainted to the original B&O olive green and gold scheme with the Presidential series name, The President Washington, onto the cab. However, since the original B&O herald number plate was not with the engine when it left service, the number plate remained on the smokebox door. The locomotive also received another cosmetic repaint in 1981, and the curved coal bunker sides tender remains much as it was in service.

No. 5300 was initially put on static display at the museum in November 1968, and it subsequently spent the next thirty-seven years sitting outdoors alongside other locomotives, including No. 300 (which was renumbered to its original number, 4500), EMC EA No. 51, Chesapeake and Ohio 4-6-4 No. 490, and Reading 4-8-4 No. 2101. While being displayed outdoors, the locomotive would remain exposed to the elements and would cosmetically deteriorate.[10] In 2006, No. 5300 was put inside one of the museum's buildings to remain safe out of the elements and received a fresh repaint in its original olive green color. During the winter seasons, the locomotive has been temporarily re-lettered The Polar Express, to promote the Museum's Polar Express-themed excursion trains. On August 28, 2021, No. 5300 was removed from static display and towed to the museum's locomotive shop for cosmetic refurbishment. The cosmetic restoration will likely take over several years. The locomotive received a cosmetic restoration to its as-built appearance. Currently on static display at the Baltimore and Ohio Railroad Museum in Baltimore, Maryland, it is the only "Pacific" type locomotive built for the B&O to have been preserved.

In fiction 
The Class P7 also made appearances in Thomas & Friends as the engine Caitlin is based on the streamlined P7d, more specifically engine No. 5304 “President Monroe”.

References 

P-7
Passenger locomotives
4-6-2 locomotives
Railway locomotives introduced in 1927
Baldwin locomotives
Standard gauge locomotives of the United States
Steam locomotives of the United States